The Burj Vista is a twin-tower skyscraper complex in Dubai, United Arab Emirates consisting of a 66-storey tower and 20-storey tower. Both towers are residential and consist of 520 and 120 apartments respectively. It was designed by Adrian Smith,  who also designed Burj Khalifa. Sometimes the Burj Vista is also called The Grand Boulevard Tower.

See also
Downtown Dubai

References

Emporis.com
Ameinfo.com

Residential skyscrapers in Dubai